was a  after Tenpyō-jingo and before Hōki. This period spanned the years from August 767 through October 770. This was the same woman who had reigned previously as the former .

Change of era
 767 : The new era name was created to mark an event or series of events. The previous era ended and the new one commenced in Tenpyō-jingo 3, on the 18th day of the 8th month of 767.

Events of the Jingo-keiun era
 8 September 769 (Jingo-keiun 3, 4th day of the 8th month): In the 5th year of Shōtoku-tennōs reign (称徳天皇5年), the empress died; and she designated Senior Counselor Prince Shirakabe as her heir.
 770 (Jingo-keiun 3, 4th day of the 8th month): The succession (senso) was received by a 62-year-old grandson of Emperor Tenji.
 770 (Jingo-keiun 3, 1st day of the 10th month): Emperor Kōnin was is said to have acceded to the throne (sokui) in a formal ceremony;and the nengō was   changed to Hōki on the very same day.

The Jingō-kaihō''' was a copper coin issued from 765 to 796. It had a diameter of about 23 mm and a weight of between 3.4 and 4.5 grams.

See also
Wadōkaichin

Notes

References
 Brown, Delmer M. and Ichirō Ishida, eds. (1979).  Gukanshō: The Future and the Past. Berkeley: University of California Press. ;  OCLC 251325323
 Nussbaum, Louis-Frédéric and Käthe Roth. (2005).  Japan encyclopedia. Cambridge: Harvard University Press. ;  OCLC 58053128
 Titsingh, Isaac. (1834). Nihon Odai Ichiran; ou,  Annales des empereurs du Japon.  Paris: Royal Asiatic Society, Oriental Translation Fund of Great Britain and Ireland. OCLC 5850691
 Varley, H. Paul. (1980). A Chronicle of Gods and Sovereigns: Jinnō Shōtōki of Kitabatake Chikafusa.'' New York: Columbia University Press. ;  OCLC 6042764

External links
 National Diet Library, "The Japanese Calendar" -- historical overview plus illustrative images from library's collection

Japanese eras
8th century in Japan
767 beginnings
770 endings